The Lebombo bone is a bone tool made of a baboon fibula with incised markings discovered in the Lebombo Mountains located between South Africa and Eswatini. Changes in the section of the notches indicate the use of different cutting edges, which the bone's discoverer, Peter Beaumont, views as evidence for their having been made, like other markings found all over the world, during participation in rituals.

The bone is between 44,200 and 43,000 years old, according to 24 radiocarbon datings. This is far older than the Ishango bone with which it is sometimes confused. Other notched bones are 80,000 years old but it is unclear if the notches are merely decorative or if they 
bear a functional meaning.

According to The Universal Book of Mathematics the Lebombo bone's 29 notches suggest "it may have been used as a lunar phase counter, in which case African women may have been the first mathematicians, because keeping track of menstrual cycles requires a lunar calendar". However, the bone is broken at one end, so the 29 notches may or may not be the total number. In the cases of other notched bones since found globally, there has been no consistent notch tally, many being in the 1–10 range.

See also
History of mathematics
Tally sticks

References

External links
Images at African Heritage

Mathematical tools
Archaeological discoveries in South Africa
Stone Age Africa
History of mathematics
Bone carvings
Archaeology of Southern Africa